Le Boullay-Mivoye is a commune in the Eure-et-Loir department in northern France.

Geography
The village is positioned on flat land along the RN154 between Dreux and Chartres, a little closer to the former than to the latter.

History
A standing stone testifies to the existence of human settlement in prehistoric times, and the remains of various farms from the Roman and Gallo-Roman periods have also been found in the vicinity.

During the Revolution there was across France a resurgence of enthusiasm for the Gallo-Roman period, and Le Boullay-Mivoye was for a time called Le Boullay-Brutus.

Population

See also
Communes of the Eure-et-Loir department

References

Communes of Eure-et-Loir